The Global Corruption Barometer published by Transparency International is the largest survey in the world tracking public opinion on corruption. It surveys 114,000 people in 107 countries on their view of corruption.

Have you paid a bribe in 2013?

People in 107 countries have been surveyed whether they have paid a bribe to a public body during the last year; but for a small number of these countries, Albania, Azerbaijan, Brazil, Burundi, Fiji, France, Germany, Lebanon, Luxembourg, Malawi, Russia and Zambia, response data on particular questions has been excluded because of concerns about validity and reliability. The margin of error for each country is 3%. The typical sample size is 1,000 people. Four countries – Cyprus, Luxembourg, Vanuatu and Solomon Islands – have a sample size of 500 people and a margin of error of 4%.

Unlike the other similar Corruption Perception Index published by Transparency International, this is a survey directly asking the population instead of using "perceived expert opinions", which is liable to substantial bias and has been under criticism as such. In a 2013 article in Foreign Policy, Alex Cobham argued that the CPI embeds a powerful and misleading elite bias in popular perceptions of corruption, potentially contributing to a vicious cycle and at the same time incentivizing inappropriate policy responses. Cobham resumes: "the index corrupts perceptions to the extent that it's hard to see a justification for its continuing publication".

See also
Transparency International
Corruption Perceptions Index
OECD Anti-Bribery Convention
United Nations Convention against Corruption

Footnotes

External links

Bribery
Lists by country